Rolene Strauss (born 22 April 1992) is a South African beauty pageant titleholder who won Miss South Africa 2014 and was later crowned Miss World 2014. She is the third South African woman to be crowned Miss World, after Penelope Anne Coelen in 1958 and Anneline Kriel in 1974.

Strauss is currently the chairperson of the non-profit organisation The Strauss Foundation.

Personal life
Strauss was a medical student at the University of the Free State. She was born in Volksrust, South Africa, to Theresa, a nurse, and Hennie Strauss, a doctor. She is a test tube baby. In her own words "I'm a test tube baby and I believe my passion for health was born with me".

Strauss became engaged to D'Niel Strauss (no relation) in December 2014. They were later married on 6 February 2016, at the Laurent Wedding venue in Somerset West. Their first child, a son, was born in January 2017. In February 2020, she gave birth to her second son. Rolene Strauss is a devout christian.

Pageantry
Strauss won her first title at age 15, when she won the Elite Model Look South Africa competition in 2007. Strauss later placed in the top 5 of Miss South Africa 2011, where Melinda Bam became the winner. She returned three years later to compete, representing Bloemfontein, and was crowned Miss South Africa 2014.

As Miss South Africa 2014, Strauss was expected to compete at both Miss Universe 2014 and Miss World 2014. Strauss competed in the Miss World 2014 contest in London, United Kingdom and during the final question and answer round, Strauss was asked - “Why should you be the next Miss World?” to which Strauss responded by stating:

She was eventually crowned as Miss World 2014 at the end of the event, becoming the third South African to Miss World since the pageant's inception in 1951. Because of this, she could not compete at Miss Universe 2014. Ziphozakhe Zokufa, her first runner-up, stepped in as Miss South Africa 2014 and represented the country at the Miss Universe 2014 competition.

After being crowned Miss World 2014 , Strauss began her responsibilities as Miss World and has since travelled to Hong Kong, China, Indonesia, India, Philippines, Brazil, Sri Lanka, Mexico, Kenya, Jamaica, Cameroon, United Kingdom, the United States amongst other countries to fulfil her various obligations in the role.

Strauss was invited as a judge in Miss World 2018, becoming the first and so far the only Miss World from the 2010s to become a judge in a Miss World finals.

References

External links
 Miss World 2014 Winner
 

1992 births
21st-century South African non-fiction writers
21st-century South African philanthropists
21st-century South African women writers
In vitro fertilisation
Living people
Miss World winners
Miss World 2014 delegates
Miss South Africa winners
People from Mbombela
South African beauty pageant winners
South African women non-fiction writers
South African women philanthropists
Stellenbosch University alumni
University of the Free State alumni
White South African people
21st-century women philanthropists
South African Christians